Ourikéla is a village and rural commune in the Cercle of Yorosso in the Sikasso Region of southern Mali. The commune covers an area of 578 square kilometers and includes 10 villages. In the 2009 census it had a population of 23,855. The village of Ourikéla, the administrative center (chef-lieu) of the commune, is 41 km southwest of Yorosso.

References

External links
.

Communes of Sikasso Region